Dissanthelium is a genus of plants in the grass family. It is native to the Americas, especially in the Andes of South America.

The only species native to the United States, D. californicum, was thought to be extinct until a single population was discovered on Santa Catalina Island, California, in 2005.

 Species
 Dissanthelium amplivaginatum - Ancash in Peru
 Dissanthelium breve - Peru, Bolivia
 Dissanthelium brevifolium - Peru
 Dissanthelium californicum - California (Santa Catalina I, †San Clemente I), †Baja California (†Guadalupe I)
 Dissanthelium calycinum - Peru, Bolivia, Mexico
 Dissanthelium giganteum - Peru
 Dissanthelium laxifolium Swallen & Tovar - Peru, Bolivia
 Dissanthelium longifolium Tovar - Huánuco in Peru
 Dissanthelium longiligulatum Swallen & Tovar - La Paz in Bolivia
 Dissanthelium macusaniense (E.H.L.Krause) R.C.Foster & L.B.Sm. - Peru, Bolivia, Argentina
 Dissanthelium peruvianum - Peru, Bolivia, Argentina, Chile
 Dissanthelium pygmaeum - Huancavelica in Peru
 Dissanthelium rauhii - Peru
 Dissanthelium trollii - La Paz in Bolivia, eastern Peru

 formerly included
see Poa
 Dissanthelium atropidiforme - Poa atropidiformis
 Dissanthelium patagonicum - Poa atropidiformis

References

Pooideae
Poaceae genera